The 1917 Buffalo Bisons football team represented the University of Buffalo as an independent during the 1917 college football season. Led by Art Powell in his second season as head coach, the team compiled a record of 444.

Schedule

References

Buffalo
Buffalo Bulls football seasons
Buffalo Bisons football